MV Timaru Star may refer to:

Ship names